Sean Sheehy (born 1952) was an Irish soccer player during the 1970s.

He played for Dundalk before transferring to Preston North End F.C. in August 1972 .

In October 1974 he signed for Bohemians  and scored the goal that won the 1974–75 League title for Bohemians.

Signed for League newcomers Thurles Town in September 1977 .
Replaced Jimmy McGeough as Thurles Town manager in January 1978  but resigned in March .

Sheehy was capped by the Republic of Ireland twice at U23 level, four times at youth level and three times as an amateur.

Honours
League of Ireland: 2
 Bohemians - 1974/75
 Dundalk F.C. - 1975/76
League of Ireland Cup: 1
 Bohemians - 1975

Republic of Ireland association footballers
Republic of Ireland under-23 international footballers
League of Ireland players
Dundalk F.C. players
Bohemian F.C. players
Shelbourne F.C. players
Republic of Ireland football managers
League of Ireland managers
Living people
1952 births
Dundee United F.C. players
Scottish Football League players
Association footballers not categorized by position